Auezov Theater (Muhtar Áýezov atyndaǵı teatry) is a station on Line 1 of the Almaty Metro. The station opened on December 1, 2011.

References 

Almaty Metro stations
Railway stations opened in 2011
2011 establishments in Kazakhstan